Psy 4 de la Rime are a French hip hop band formed 1995 in Marseille comprising several rappers with immigrant backgrounds from former French colonies. Their original name was KDB, Kid Dog Black. The band was signed to 361 Records, a Marseille-based independent label founded by fellow rapper Akhenaton. The group had three albums, the debut Block Party (2002), Enfants de la lune (2005) and Les cités d'or (2008). After split, members particularly Soprano and Alonzo went on to have very successful solo careers with their own albums and single hits. The formation got together in 2013 to release a fourth album called 4eme Dimension that made to number 3 on the French Albums Chart.

Solo careers of members
Even before the split-up, some of the individual rappers in the band have continued their solo careers. 
Most notable of them was Soprano who had already released a solo album while in the band titled Puisqu'il faut vivre that had made it to #2 in the SNEP French Albums Chart. His album La Colombe released in 2010 has even topped the French Albums Chart, with the follow-up 2011 album Le Corbeau making to number 3 on the same chart. In 2012 he had a joint album with R.E.D.K. titled E=2MC's making it to number 6 and a solo album Cosmopolitanie reaching number 2 in 2014. Soprano has had ten singles reach the Top 20 of the French Singles charts, including "Cosmo", "Fresh Prince", and "Le Diable ne s'habille plus en Prada" cracking the Top 10. 
In similar fashion, Segnor Alonzo has continued to enjoy a good career under the shortened name Alonzo releasing three albums of his own starting with his 2009 solo album Un dernier coup d'œil dans le rétroviseur immediately after the split-up followed by the successful and critically acclaimed Les temps modernes in 2010, Amour, gloire & cité in 2012 making it to number 9 and the hugely successful Règlement de comptes reaching number 2 in the French Albums Chart.
Sya Styles continued to collaborate in a number of productions including with IAM, Freeman and DJ Abdel. On 26 October 2015, DJ Sya Styles, the DJ of the formation died of illness. He was 37. Soprano said it would be impossible to release a "Psy4 with 3 members" album, meaning an album without Sya Styles.

Discography

Albums

Live albums

Singles

References

External links 
 Official Site (En)
 361 Records
 Listen to Psy4 De La Rime's discography

French hip hop groups
Musical groups from Marseille